The ESIGELEC is a French school of engineers located in Rouen that was created in 1901. It is part of the best French academic institutions known as Grandes écoles specialized in engineering and sciences and is a university level institution with the special status Grands établissements. It is under supervision of the Ministry of Higher Education and Research and jointly managed by the chamber of commerce of Rouen, the Society of Engineers in Electrical Engineering (from French "Société des Ingénieurs en Génie Électrique", SIGELEC), and a consortium of private companies.

History

In 1901, Alexandre Charliat, an engineer from École Centrale Paris, decided to create a school of engineers corresponding to its own perspective on education. He named it the Practical School of Industrial Electricity (from French "École Pratique d'Électricité Industrielle") and established it at 53 rue Belliard in Paris. The school later became the School of Industrial Electricity of Paris (from French EEIP "École d'Électricité Industrielle de Paris"). It will change one last time of name in 1980, and becomes the Superior School of Electrical Engineers (École Supérieure d'Ingénieurs en Génie ÉLECtrique, ESIGELEC).

The Ministry of Higher Education and Research recognizes the school as a Grandes écoles in 1922 and the Commission des Titres d'Ingénieur authorizes it to award the Diplôme d'Ingénieur in 1936. In 1989, ESIGELEC becomes a permanent member of the Grande Ecole conference (Conférence des grandes écoles). In 2011, ESIGELEC becomes an associate school of the Institut Mines-Télécom (Mines Télécom Institut of Technology) and the Groupe des écoles des mines.
The Commission des Titres d'Ingénieur renews its capacitation to grant the Diplôme d'Ingénieur in 2014 for the maximal duration of 6 years.

The school resettles many times. The first resettlement happened in 1968 and saw all the components of the school moved to Beauvais. Then, the board of directors understood that the only way to develop the school with its very own educational values was to relocate it far from Paris and all the parisian schools of engineers. They decided to move to Mont-Saint-Aignan, a city close from Rouen, in 1991. This genius idea also benefits directly to students as apartment rentals are much higher in the capital. In 2004, funding is released to offer the school its own state of the art facilities. The school relocates in the Technopôle du Madrillet, in Saint-Étienne-du-Rouvray, south of Rouen, an area dedicated to innovation with many companies and three academic institutions. The staff and students moved into the new buildings 16 September 2005, day of the inauguration.

Status
ESIGELEC is a semi-private school of engineers. It is under supervision of the Ministry of Higher Education and Research but is co-led by the chamber of commerce of Rouen. It has been created as a nonprofit organization according to the law of 1901. Therefore, students have to make a contribution to the student fee partially paid by private and public funds and the school cannot be profitable.

Education

Degrees

Prep School
ESIGELEC has an integrated Classe préparatoire aux grandes écoles accessible after the Baccalauréat.

Engineering cycle
ESIGELEC is capacitaded by the Commission des titres d'ingénieur to award a Diplôme d'Ingénieur which is equivalent to a master's degree.
As French Government requires it, it is awarded after three years of study. Eligible applicants are students having successfully achieved the prep school, a two-year Classe préparatoire aux grandes écoles or an equivalent university level.

Unions

Schools of engineers in France are known to promote student life in order to create strong relations between students and allow them to do things they could not do at Classe préparatoire aux grandes écoles, the two-year of intense study preceding the entry in the engineering cycle.

ESIGELEC strengthen this reputation by investing money in student unions. The student bureau or student union office (from French " Bureau Des Elèves ", BDE) is elected every year in May by the students. It consists of second year students of the engineering cycle gathering in lists and campaigning to obtain the management of the union office. The campaign lasts one week and implies an important organisation.

The student bureau has in charge to organize the integration week (a program to welcome the incoming students) and to finance the other unions of the school.

The unions of the school are:
La Tortue Déchainée: The newspaper of ESIGELEC.
ESIG’AERO: The union for those who love planes and parachuting.
Gala ESIGELEC
Defi 24h
4L Trophy
Club Zik

Research
ESIGELEC is one of the few French schools to have its own research center. It is in 2001 that the Research Institute for Embedded Electronic Systems (from French "Institut de Recherche en Systèmes Electroniques Embarqués", IRSEEM) is created, a research laboratory specialized on embedded systems. In 2010, the laying of the foundation stone of a state of the art research facility is made to create the Embedded Systems Integration Campus (from French "Campus d'Intégration des Systèmes Embarqués", CISE). It is inaugurated in 2012. This center, dedicated to electrical systems and mecatronics, reinforces the range of research and teaching capabilities of both ESIGELEC and IRSEEM.

International

Partnerships
ESIGELEC has many famous international partners around the world with agreements of double-degrees and exchange programs.

United States
Lehigh University

University of Pittsburgh, Swanson School of Engineering

United Kingdom
Cranfield University

Russia
Saint Petersburg State University of Aerospace Instrumentation

India

Manipal University
Muthoot Institute of Technology & Science

Ranks and prizes
It has been ranked in the top 50 in 2014 by the serious French newspaper L'Usine nouvelle.

References

External links 
 Students' Main Web Portal

Grandes écoles
Engineering universities and colleges in France